The 2010–11 Orlando Magic season was the 22nd season of the Orlando Magic in the National Basketball Association (NBA). This was their first season at the Amway Center.

In the playoffs, the Magic lost to the Atlanta Hawks in six games in the First Round.

Key dates
 June 24: The 2010 NBA draft was held in New York City.
 July 1: The free agency period started.
 October 28: The regular season began.

Summary

NBA Draft 2010

Transactions

Free agents acquired

Free agents lost

Players re-signed

Roster

Pre-season

Game log

|- bgcolor="#ccffcc"
| 1
| October 5
| @ Houston
| 
| Dwight Howard (19)
| Dwight Howard (12)
| Jameer Nelson (7)
| State Farm Arena4,854
| 1–0
|- bgcolor="#ccffcc"
| 2
| October 8
| @ Indiana
| 
| Vince Carter (25)
| Ryan Anderson (16)
| Jameer Nelson (7)
| Conseco Fieldhouse10,001
| 2–0
|- bgcolor="#ccffcc"
| 3
| October 10
| New Orleans
| 
| Ryan Anderson,Rashard Lewis,JJ Redick (23)
| Dwight Howard (11)
| Chris Duhon (7)
| Amway Center18,516
| 3–0
|- bgcolor="#ccffcc"
| 4
| October 14
| Charlotte
| 
| Brandon Bass (16)
| Brandon Bass (9)
| Chris Duhon (6)
| Amway Center18,846
| 4–0
|- bgcolor="#ccffcc"
| 5
| October 16
| Chicago
| 
| Vince Carter (21)
| Dwight Howard (11)
| Chris Duhon (7)
| Amway Center18,846
| 5–0
|- bgcolor="#ccffcc"
| 6
| October 18
| @ Atlanta
| 
| Brandon Bass (17)
| Dwight Howard (13)
| Chris Duhon (10)
| Philips Arena7,571
| 6–0
|- bgcolor="#ccffcc"
| 7
| October 20
| Dallas
| 
| Vince Carter,Dwight Howard (20)
| Dwight Howard (13)
| Jameer Nelson (10)
| Amway Center18,846
| 7–0
|- bgcolor="#dfdfdf"
| 8
| October 22
| @ Miami
|colspan="4"|Cancelled
| St. Pete Times Forum
| –
|-

Regular season

Standings

Record vs. opponents

Game log

|- bgcolor="#ccffcc"
| 1
| October 28
| Washington
| 
| Dwight Howard (23)
| Dwight Howard (10)
| Jameer Nelson (6)
| Amway Center18,918
| 1–0
|- bgcolor="#ffcccc"
| 2
| October 29
| @ Miami
| 
| Dwight Howard (19)
| Dwight Howard,Marcin Gortat (7)
| Jameer Nelson,Quentin Richardson,JJ Redick,Brandon Bass,Chris Duhon (1)
| American Airlines Arena19,600
| 1–1

|- bgcolor="#ccffcc"
| 3
| November 3
| Minnesota
| 
| Vince Carter (20)
| Dwight Howard (16)
| Jameer Nelson (9)
| Amway Center18,846
| 2–1
|- bgcolor="#ccffcc"
| 4
| November 5
| New Jersey
| 
| Dwight Howard (30)
| Dwight Howard (16)
| Jameer Nelson (6)
| Amway Center18,846
| 3–1
|- bgcolor="#ccffcc" 
| 5
| November 6
| @ Charlotte
| 
| Dwight Howard,Rashard Lewis (22)
| Dwight Howard (8)
| Chris Duhon (9)
| Time Warner Cable Arena18,136
| 4–1
|- bgcolor="#ccffcc"
| 6
| November 8
| Atlanta
| 
| Dwight Howard (27)
| Dwight Howard (11)
| Chris Duhon (4)
| Amway Center18,846
| 5–1
|- bgcolor="#ffcccc"
| 7
| November 10
| Utah
| 
| Vince Carter (20)
| Marcin Gortat (10)
| Jameer Nelson (7)
| Amway Center18,846
| 5–2
|- bgcolor="#ffcccc"
| 8
| November 12
| Toronto
| 
| Dwight Howard (25)
| Dwight Howard (8)
| Jameer Nelson (8)
| Amway Center18,846
| 5–3
|- bgcolor="#ccffcc"
| 9
| November 13
| @ New Jersey
| 
| Dwight Howard (16)
| Dwight Howard (10)
| Chris Duhon,Jameer Nelson (4)
| Prudential Center15,086
| 6–3
|- bgcolor="#ccffcc"
| 10
| November 15
| Memphis
| 
| Vince Carter (19)
| Dwight Howard (14)
| Rashard Lewis,Jameer Nelson (4)
| Amway Center18,846
| 7–3
|- bgcolor="#ccffcc"
| 11
| November 18
| Phoenix
| 
| Dwight Howard (20)
| Dwight Howard (12)
| Jameer Nelson (12)
| Amway Center18,846
| 8–3
|- bgcolor="#ccffcc"
| 12
| November 20
| @ Indiana
| 
| Dwight Howard (25)
| Dwight Howard (12)
| Jameer Nelson (9)
| Conseco Fieldhouse14,583
| 9–3
|- bgcolor="#ffcccc"
| 13
| November 22
| @ San Antonio
| 
| Dwight Howard (26)
| Dwight Howard (18)
| Jameer Nelson (5)
| AT&T Center17,627
| 9–4
|- bgcolor="#ccffcc"
| 14
| November 24
| Miami
| 
| Dwight Howard (24)
| Dwight Howard (18)
| Jameer Nelson (14)
| Amway Center18,936
| 10–4
|- bgcolor="#ccffcc"
| 15
| November 26
| Cleveland
| 
| Dwight Howard (23)
| Dwight Howard (11)
| Chris Duhon (9)
| Amway Center18,846
| 11–4
|- bgcolor="#ccffcc"
| 16
| November 27
| @ Washington
| 
| Dwight Howard (32)
| Dwight Howard (11)
| Jameer Nelson (4)
| Verizon Center16,435
| 12–4
|- bgcolor="#ccffcc"
| 17
| November 30
| Detroit
| 
| Rashard Lewis (20)
| Dwight Howard (14)
| Jameer Nelson (9)
| Amway Center18,846
| 13–4

|- bgcolor="#ccffcc"
| 18
| December 1
| @ Chicago
| 
| Jameer Nelson (24)
| Dwight Howard (12)
| Jameer Nelson (9)
| United Center21,435
| 14–4
|- bgcolor="#ccffcc"
| 19
| December 3
| @ Detroit
| 
| Brandon Bass (27)
| Marcin Gortat (11)
| Vince Carter (9)
| The Palace of Auburn Hills18,433
| 15–4
|- bgcolor="#ffcccc"
| 20
| December 4
| @ Milwaukee
| 
| Vince Carter (20)
| Marcin Gortat (10)
| Vince Carter (6)
| Bradley Center16,218
| 15–5
|- bgcolor="#ffcccc"
| 21
| December 6
| Atlanta
| 
| Vince Carter (18)
| Dwight Howard (13)
| Vince Carter (3)
| Amway Center18,846
| 15–6
|- bgcolor="#ffcccc"
| 22
| December 9
| @ Portland
| 
| Dwight Howard (39)
| Dwight Howard (15)
| Jameer Nelson (5)
| Rose Garden20,219
| 15–7
|- bgcolor="#ffcccc"
| 23
| December 10
| @ Utah
| 
| Jameer Nelson (19)
| Dwight Howard (12)
| Jameer Nelson (10)
| EnergySolutions Arena18,765
| 15–8
|- bgcolor="#ccffcc"
| 24
| December 12
| @ L.A. Clippers
| 
| Dwight Howard (22)
| Brandon Bass (11)
| Jameer Nelson (9)
| Staples Center18,278
| 16–8
|- bgcolor="#ffcccc"
| 25
| December 14
| @ Denver
| 
| JJ Redick (29)
| Dwight Howard (14)
| Jameer Nelson (8)
| Pepsi Center16,427
| 16–9
|- bgcolor="#ffcccc"
| 26
| December 18
| Philadelphia
| 
| Dwight Howard (26)
| Dwight Howard (20)
| Jameer Nelson (9)
| Amway Center18,846
| 16–10
|- bgcolor="#ffcccc"
| 27
| December 20
| @ Atlanta
| 
| Dwight Howard (19)
| Dwight Howard (20)
| Gilbert Arenas,Jameer Nelson,Jason Richardson,Hedo Türkoğlu (3)
| Philips Arena16,275
| 16–11
|- bgcolor="#ffcccc"
| 28
| December 21
| Dallas
| 
| Dwight Howard (26)
| Dwight Howard (23)
| Hedo Türkoğlu (8)
| Amway Center19,057
| 16–12
|- bgcolor="#ccffcc"
| 29
| December 23
| San Antonio
| 
| Dwight Howard (29)
| Dwight Howard (14)
| Gilbert Arenas (9)
| Amway Center18,916
| 17–12
|- bgcolor="#ccffcc"
| 30
| December 25
| Boston
| 
| Brandon Bass (21)
| Dwight Howard (11)
| Hedo Türkoğlu (4)
| Amway Center19,013
| 18–12
|- bgcolor="#ccffcc"
| 31
| December 27
| @ New Jersey
| 
| Hedo Türkoğlu (20)
| Dwight Howard (13)
| Jameer Nelson (7)
| Prudential Center11,514
| 19–12
|- bgcolor="#ccffcc"
| 32
| December 28
| @ Cleveland
| 
| Gilbert Arenas (22)
| Gilbert Arenas,Dwight Howard,Hedo Türkoğlu (6)
| Gilbert Arenas (11)
| Quicken Loans Arena20,562
| 20–12
|- bgcolor="#ccffcc"
| 33
| December 30
| New York
| 
| Dwight Howard (24)
| Dwight Howard (18)
| Jameer Nelson (7)
| Amway Center19,090
| 21–12

|- bgcolor="#ccffcc"
| 34
| January 3
| Golden State
| 
| Dwight Howard (22)
| Dwight Howard (17)
| Hedo Türkoğlu (10)
| Amway Center18,846
| 22–12
|- bgcolor="#ccffcc"
| 35
| January 5
| Milwaukee
| 
| Dwight Howard (28)
| Dwight Howard (13)
| Jameer Nelson (9)
| Amway Center18,846
| 23–12
|- bgcolor="#ccffcc"
| 36
| January 7
| Houston
| 
| Brandon Bass,Jason Richardson (18)
| Dwight Howard (11)
| Jameer Nelson (8)
| Amway Center19,107
| 24–12
|- bgcolor="#ccffcc"
| 37
| January 8
| @ Dallas
| 
| Dwight Howard (23)
| Dwight Howard (13)
| Hedo Türkoğlu (17)
| American Airlines Center20,178
| 25–12
|- bgcolor="#ffcccc"
| 38
| January 12
| @ New Orleans
| 
| Dwight Howard (29)
| Dwight Howard (20)
| Jameer Nelson (10)
| New Orleans Arena13,688
| 25–13
|- bgcolor="#ffcccc"
| 39
| January 13
| @ Oklahoma City
| 
| Dwight Howard (39)
| Dwight Howard (18)
| Hedo Türkoğlu (8)
| Oklahoma City Arena18,203
| 25–14
|- bgcolor="#ccffcc"
| 40
| January 15
| @ Minnesota
| 
| JJ Redick,Jason Richardson (21)
| Ryan Anderson (11)
| Gilbert Arenas,Jameer Nelson (7)
| Target Center17,391
| 26–14
|- bgcolor="#ffcccc"
| 41
| January 17
| @ Boston
| 
| Dwight Howard (33)
| Dwight Howard (13)
| Hedo Türkoğlu (7)
| TD Garden18,624
| 26–15
|- bgcolor="#ccffcc"
| 42
| January 19
| Philadelphia
| 
| Ryan Anderson (20)
| Brandon Bass (10)
| Jameer Nelson (7)
| Amway Center18,846
| 27–15
|- bgcolor="#ccffcc"
| 43
| January 21
| Toronto
| 
| Dwight Howard (31)
| Dwight Howard (19)
| Jameer Nelson (8)
| Amway Center19,047
| 28–15
|- bgcolor="#ccffcc"
| 44
| January 22
| @ Houston
| 
| Dwight Howard (22)
| Dwight Howard (14)
| Jameer Nelson (9)
| Toyota Center18,052
| 29–15
|- bgcolor="#ffcccc"
| 45
| January 24
| Detroit
| 
| Ryan Anderson (21)
| Dwight Howard (16)
| Hedo Türkoğlu (7)
| Amway Center19,098
| 29–16
|- bgcolor="#ccffcc"
| 46
| January 26
| @ Indiana
| 
| Dwight Howard,Jason Richardson (19)
| Dwight Howard (16)
| Jameer Nelson,Hedo Türkoğlu (4)
| Conseco Fieldhouse12,164
| 30–16
|- bgcolor="#ffcccc"
| 47
| January 28
| @ Chicago
| 
| Dwight Howard (40)
| Dwight Howard (15)
| Jason Richardson,Hedo Türkoğlu (5)
| United Center21,676
| 30–17
|- bgcolor="#ccffcc"
| 48
| January 30
| Cleveland
| 
| Ryan Anderson (23)
| Dwight Howard (20)
| Jameer Nelson (8)
| Amway Center18,846
| 31–17
|- bgcolor="#ffcccc"
| 49
| January 31
| @ Memphis
| 
| Dwight Howard (25)
| Dwight Howard (14)
| Jameer Nelson (4)
| FedExForum13,513
| 31–18

|- bgcolor="#ffcccc"
| 50
| February 3
| Miami
| 
| Jameer Nelson (22)
| Dwight Howard (16)
| Jameer Nelson (6)
| Amway Center18,945
| 31–19
|- bgcolor="#ccffcc"
| 51
| February 4
| @ Washington
| 
| Dwight Howard (22)
| Dwight Howard (15)
| Jameer Nelson (11)
| Verizon Center18,940
| 32–19
|- bgcolor="#ffcccc"
| 52
| February 6
| @ Boston
| 
| Dwight Howard (28)
| Dwight Howard (13)
| Hedo Türkoğlu (4)
| TD Garden18,624
| 32–20
|- bgcolor="#ccffcc"
| 53
| February 8
| L.A. Clippers
| 
| Dwight Howard (22)
| Dwight Howard (20)
| Hedo Türkoğlu (7)
| Amway Center18,987
| 33–20
|- bgcolor="#ccffcc"
| 54
| February 9
| @ Philadelphia
| 
| Dwight Howard (30)
| Dwight Howard (17)
| Jameer Nelson (8)
| Wells Fargo Center12,091
| 34–20
|- bgcolor="#ffcccc"
| 55
| February 11
| New Orleans
| 
| Dwight Howard (20)
| Dwight Howard (17)
| Jameer Nelson,Hedo Türkoğlu (5)
| Amway Center18,994
| 34–21
|- bgcolor="#ccffcc"
| 56
| February 13
| L.A. Lakers
| 
| Dwight Howard (31)
| Dwight Howard (13)
| JJ Redick(4)
| Amway Center18,994
| 35–21
|- bgcolor="#ccffcc"
| 57
| February 16
| Washington
| 
| Dwight Howard (32)
| Brandon Bass (11)
| Gilbert Arenas (6)
| Amway Center19,054
| 36–21
|- align="center"
|colspan="9" bgcolor="#bbcaff"|All-Star Break
|- bgcolor="#ffcccc"
| 58
| February 23
| Sacramento
| 
| Dwight Howard (31)
| Dwight Howard (17)
| Hedo Türkoğlu (8)
| Amway Center19,146
| 36–22
|- bgcolor="#ccffcc"
| 59
| February 25
| Oklahoma City
| 
| Dwight Howard (40)
| Dwight Howard (15)
| Hedo Türkoğlu (10)
| Amway Center19,011
| 37–22
|- bgcolor="#ccffcc"
| 60
| February 27
| Charlotte
| 
| Dwight Howard (20)
| Dwight Howard (10)
| Jameer Nelson (7)
| Amway Center18,846
| 38–22

|- bgcolor="#ccffcc"
| 61
| March 1
| New York
| 
| Dwight Howard (30)
| Dwight Howard (16)
| Chris Duhon (5)
| Amway Center19,131
| 39–22
|- bgcolor="#ccffcc"
| 62
| March 3
| @ Miami
| 
| Jason Richardson (24)
| Dwight Howard (18)
| Jameer Nelson (7)
| American Airlines Arena19,600
| 40–22
|- bgcolor="#ffcccc"
| 63
| March 4
| Chicago
| 
| Dwight Howard (20)
| Dwight Howard (10)
| Jameer Nelson (6)
| Amway Center19,207
| 40–23
|- bgcolor="#ffcccc"
| 64
| March 7
| Portland
| 
| Jason Richardson (22)
| Earl Clark (9)
| Jameer Nelson (4)
| Amway Center19,001
| 40–24
|- bgcolor="#ccffcc"
| 65
| March 9
| @ Sacramento
| 
| Jameer Nelson (26)
| Dwight Howard (15)
| Jameer Nelson (4)
| Power Balance Pavilion12,728
| 41–24
|- bgcolor="#ffcccc"
| 66
| March 11
| @ Golden State
| 
| Jason Richardson (30)
| Dwight Howard (21)
| Jameer Nelson (8)
| Oracle Arena19,596
| 41–25
|- bgcolor="#ccffcc"
| 67
| March 13
| @ Phoenix
| 
| Dwight Howard (26)
| Dwight Howard (15)
| Chris Duhon (4)
| US Airways Center18,091
| 42–25
|- bgcolor="#ffcccc"
| 68
| March 14
| @ L.A. Lakers
| 
| Dwight Howard (22)
| Dwight Howard (15)
| Jameer Nelson (8)
| Staples Center18,997
| 42–26
|- bgcolor="#ccffcc"
| 69
| March 16
| @ Milwaukee
| 
| Dwight Howard (31)
| Dwight Howard (22)
| Hedo Türkoğlu (5)
| Bradley Center13,831
| 43–26
|- bgcolor="#ccffcc"
| 70
| March 18
| Denver
| 
| Dwight Howard (16)
| Dwight Howard (18)
| Hedo Türkoğlu (8)
| Amway Center19,113
| 44–26
|- bgcolor="#ccffcc"
| 71
| March 21
| @ Cleveland
| 
| Dwight Howard (28)
| Dwight Howard (18)
| Hedo Türkoğlu (9)
| Quicken Loans Arena19,343
| 45–26
|- bgcolor="#ccffcc"
| 72
| March 23
| @ New York
| 
| Dwight Howard (33)
| Dwight Howard,Hedo Türkoğlu (11)
| Jameer Nelson,Hedo Türkoğlu (4)
| Madison Square Garden19,763
| 46–26
|- bgcolor="#ccffcc"
| 73
| March 25
| New Jersey
| 
| Dwight Howard (21)
| Dwight Howard (14)
| Hedo Türkoğlu (13)
| Amway Center19,087
| 47–26
|- bgcolor="#ffcccc"
| 74
| March 28
| @ New York
| 
| Dwight Howard (29)
| Dwight Howard (18)
| Gilbert Arenas (5)
| Madison Square Garden19,763
| 47–27
|- bgcolor="#ffcccc"
| 75
| March 30
| @ Atlanta
| 
| Jameer Nelson (20)
| Dwight Howard (13)
| Jameer Nelson,Hedo Türkoğlu (5)
| Philips Arena15,114
| 47–28

|- bgcolor="#ccffcc"
| 76
| April 1
| Charlotte
| 
| Dwight Howard (26)
| Dwight Howard (14)
| Hedo Türkoğlu (7)
| Amway Center18,969
| 48–28
|- bgcolor="#ffcccc"
| 77
| April 3
| @ Toronto
| 
| Dwight Howard (31)
| Brandon Bass,Dwight Howard (9)
| Jameer Nelson (7)
| Air Canada Centre19,800
| 48–29
|- bgcolor="#ccffcc"
| 78
| April 5
| Milwaukee
| 
| Dwight Howard (18)
| Dwight Howard (17)
| Jameer Nelson,Hedo Türkoğlu (30
| Amway Center18,996
| 49–29
|- bgcolor="#ccffcc"
| 79
| April 6
| @ Charlotte
| 
| Gilbert Arenas (25)
| Brandon Bass (8)
| Jameer Nelson (9)
| Time Warner Cable Arena16,234
| 50–29
|- bgcolor="#ffcccc"
| 80
| April 10
| Chicago
| 
| Ryan Anderson (28)
| Ryan Anderson (10)
| Jameer Nelson (11)
| Amway Center19,181
| 50–30
|- bgcolor="#ccffcc"
| 81
| April 11
| @ Philadelphia
| 
| Dwight Howard,Jameer Nelson (19)
| Ryan Anderson (14)
| Jameer Nelson (7)
| Wells Fargo Center19,139
| 51–30
|- bgcolor="#ccffcc"
| 82
| April 13
| Indiana
| 
| Ryan Anderson (14)
| Dwight Howard (13)
| Chris Duhon (5)
| Amway Center19,169
| 52–30
|-

Playoffs

Game log

|- bgcolor=ffcccc
| 1
| April 16
| Atlanta
| 
| Dwight Howard (46)
| Dwight Howard (19)
| Hedo Türkoğlu (5)
| Amway Center19,108
| 0–1
|- bgcolor=ccffcc
| 2
| April 19
| Atlanta
| 
| Dwight Howard (33)
| Dwight Howard (19)
| Hedo Türkoğlu (5)
| Amway Center19,160
| 1–1
|- bgcolor=ffcccc
| 3
| April 22
| @ Atlanta
| 
| Dwight Howard (21)
| Dwight Howard (15)
| Jameer Nelson (10)
| Philips Arena19,865
| 1–2
|- bgcolor=ffcccc
| 4
| April 24
| @ Atlanta
| 
| Dwight Howard (29)
| Dwight Howard (17)
| Jameer Nelson (6)
| Philips Arena19,490
| 1–3
|- bgcolor=ccffcc
| 5
| April 26
| Atlanta
| 
| Jason Richardson (17)
| Dwight Howard (8)
| Jameer Nelson (5)
| Amway Center19,091
| 2–3
|- bgcolor=ffcccc
| 6
| April 28
| @ Atlanta
| 
| Dwight Howard (25)
| Dwight Howard (15)
| Jameer Nelson (6)
| Philips Arena19,282
| 2–4
|-

Player statistics

Season

Playoffs

Awards, records and milestones

Awards and honors
 Dwight Howard – Defensive Player of the Year, All-NBA 1st Team, All-Defensive 1st Team, All-Star

Week/Month

Suspensions
Dwight Howard was suspended by the NBA from the game on March 7 after accumulating 16 technical fouls.

Dwight Howard was suspended by the NBA from the game on April 10 after accumulating 18 technical fouls.

Quentin Richardson was suspended by the NBA for 2 games (April 10 and 11) for shoving Gerald Henderson during the game against the Bobcats on April 6.

Injuries and surgeries
Point guard Jameer Nelson went down with a sprained left ankle on November 5. The injury caused him to miss two games, as he returned to the starting lineup less than a week later on November 10.

Shooting guard Vince Carter went down with a knee injury on November 22. He missed three games but returned a week later on November 30.

A stomach virus affected several Orlando players from December 1–9. JJ Redick, Mickaël Piétrus, Dwight Howard, Jameer Nelson, and were all affected. Redick, Pietrus, and Howard were out until December 6, while Nelson did not return until December 9. Ryan Anderson contracted the illness as well, however he had suffered a sprained foot on November 6 which also kept him out of action.

Transactions

Trades

References

Orlando Magic seasons
Orlando
2010 in sports in Florida
2011 in sports in Florida